The Doctor's Secret (Italian: Il segreto del dottore) is a 1931 American drama film directed by Jack Salvatori and starring Soava Gallone, Lamberto Picasso and Alfredo Robert. It was made at the Joinville Studios in Paris, as the Italian-language version of Paramount Pictures's The Doctor's Secret (1929). A separate Swedish-language version had also been produced at Joinville. The film's sets were designed by Paolo Reni.

Cast
 Soava Gallone as Liliana Garner  
 Lamberto Picasso as Giovanni  
 Alfredo Robert as Il dottor Brady  
 Oreste Bilancia as Redding  
 Lina Modigliani  as La signora Redding  
 Vanna Vanni as Susanna, la cameriera 
 Antonio Niccodemi as Riccardo, marito di Liliana

References

Bibliography
 Waldman, Harry. Missing Reels: Lost Films of American and European Cinema. McFarland, 2000.

External links

1931 films
1931 drama films
Paramount Pictures films
American drama films
Films shot at Joinville Studios
1930s Italian-language films
Films based on works by J. M. Barrie
American black-and-white films
Italian-language American films
1930s American films